This page is about the IIBC Championships. For the World Bowls Tour, see World Indoor Bowls Championships.

The IIBC Championships were an annual indoor bowls international championships event, run by the governing body of the sport, the International Indoor Bowls Council (IIBC). The IIBC ran a men's singles, ladies singles and mixed pairs international championships event at senior level each year as the alternative championships to the more prominent World Indoor Bowls Championships organised by the World Bowls Tour and which features players recognised as the leading indoor players. The IIBC also organise the men's singles, ladies singles and mixed pairs international championships at under 25 level each year, which are held separately from the senior event. Although players from both hemispheres were able to compete, travelling restricted the entries and the majority of the leading indoor players from the Southern hemisphere did not take part.

In 2019, the IIBC came to an agreement with the World Bowls organisation. The agreement was to merge their two international indoor championships, the IIBC Championships and the World Cup Singles. The new event would be called the World Bowls Indoor Championships.

About IIBC 
The International Indoor Bowls Council (IIBC) is a governing body for the sport of indoor bowls. It is responsible for properly constituting the laws of the sport. Along with World Bowls Ltd and the Professional Bowls Association (PBA), they run the World Bowls Tour (WBT) each year.

Established in 1983 as the World Indoor Bowls Council. The inaugural World Indoor Championships was held in 1979 at Coatbridge. In 1987, a Ladies Section (WIBCLS) was founded, with the first WIBCLS Singles Championships taking place a year later. Following the 1992 tournament, a new organisation called the World Bowls Tour (WBT) was established, and by 1988 the World Indoor Singles and Pairs titles for men was run under the auspices of the WBT. Within twelve months, the Men and Ladies sections combined to form a newly constituted Council, resulting in the WIBC Men’s and Ladies’ World Championships. It did not take long before the first Two-Wood Mixed Pairs Championship was added to the tournament format.

The following are a list of member nations and organisations of the IIBC:

English Indoor Bowling Association (EIBA)

Guernsey Indoor Bowling Association (GIBA)

 Ireland
Association of Irish Indoor Bowls (AIBA)
Irish Women's Indoor Bowling Association (IWIBA)

Isle of Man Bowling Association (IMBA)

Jersey Indoor Bowling Association (JIBA)

Nederlandse Indoor & Outdoor Bowls Bond (NIOBB)

Scottish Indoor Bowling Association (SIBA)

Welsh Indoor Bowls Association (WIBA)
Welsh Ladies Indoor Bowls Association (WLIBA)

Senior 
In 2010, Wales' Kerry Packwood recorded the first ever whitewash and the highest score in the championships history, in a first round win against Mary Alderson from the Isle of Man, winning the match in straight sets 17–0, 19–0. In 2013, Jersey staged the senior championships for the first time. It has previously staged the under 25 event. In 2014, Julie Forrest of Scotland became the first person to win the men's or women's title for a record fourth time. In 2015, Chloe Greechan of Jersey became the youngest ever bowls world champion at 14-years-old, winning the mixed pairs title with her father, Thomas Greechan.

Finals

Under 25 
In 2004, the mixed pairs event was added to the under 25 championships for the first time. In 2005, Guernsey hosted the under 25 championships for the first time. In 2012, Amy Stanton became the first female to win the women's title three years running. In 2014, Chloe Watson became the first Irish and youngest ever winner of the women's title at the age of 17.

Finalists

References 

World championships in bowls